Hypocalymma puniceum, commonly known as the large myrtle, is a member of the family Myrtaceae endemic to Western Australia.

It blooms between December and April producing pink-red flowers.

It is found in the Wheatbelt region of Western Australia where it grows in gravelly sandy tor loam soils.

References

puniceum
Endemic flora of Western Australia
Rosids of Western Australia
Plants described in 1923